Judy Carter is an American comedian, magician, motivational speaker, and author of four books on comedy and self-improvement.

Career

Early life
Judy Carter was born in Los Angeles, California, the second daughter of Esther Silverman Carter, an entrepreneur and owner of a Beverly Hills dress boutique "My Flair Lady," and Sidney Alan Carter, a mechanical engineer for LA Water & Power.

Judy was born with a speech impediment and her older sister, Marsha, was born with serious health problems.  In order to better communicate with her sister and to make her laugh, Judy, then eight years old, began checking books on magic tricks out of the public library and would  purchase magic tricks from Joe Berg's Magic Store on Hollywood Blvd.  The tricks came with a suggested patter. Carter attributes practicing the patter to helping her overcome her speech impediment.

Magica The Magician
While still in elementary school, Carter began performing at children's birthday parties as "Magica the Magician" with her assistant PG Rogow. She performed three or four shows a weekend, and eventually adding an accordion to her act. In September 1961, the LA Times profiled Carter and PG when their backyard benefit for Cedars-Sinai hospital raised over $500.

Carter continued performing her magic for birthday parties through high school, and then her parents paid for two years of college at Cal State Northridge. Judy continued performing magic acts at birthday parties and fraternity houses. She graduated with a BA in Theatrical Arts from the University of Southern California.

By this time, Carter was performing as "Judiwitch" and was invited to perform on a local television show which aired on KCET. After doing her act, she was asked by the interviewer if she experienced discrimination being a female magician. She joked that she was often asked, "to see your bottom deal."  KCET refused to air the interview and the controversy surrounding their decision made the CBS Evening news. As a result of the media attention, Carter was contacted by Gene Murrow who invited her to run the theater and television department for the Harvard School for Boys.

In the early 1970s, Carter began performing at The Magic Castle in West Hollywood. There Ricky Jay and Johnny Thompson advised her to study sleight of hand with Dai Vernon. As a student of Vernon, Carter formed an act with mime Tina Lenert. The owner of the Magic Castle, Milt Larson, invited Carter to perform in the Close-Up Gallery at The Magic Castle. She was the first woman ever invited to do so.

Judy is divorced from Gina Rubinstein.

Comedy career
Carter switched to stand-up comedy in 1979. In 1984, Carter formed Comedy Workshop Productions, the first comedy classes ever offered in Los Angeles at Igby's Comedy Cabaret. In 1989, Carter started focusing on corporate events such as conventions and training for office-appropriate humor.

Carter has also produced the California Comedy Conference in Palm Springs.

Books
In 1989, Judy wrote Standup Comedy: The Book (Dell Books).

In 1996 she wrote The Homo Handbook, a comedic self-help guide for the LGBT community. The book won the 1997 Lambda Literary Award for best humor book.

In 2001 she wrote another book on stand-up comedy, The Comedy Bible (Simon & Schuster) The book describes different aspects of working as a stand-up comedian.

Motivational speaking
Carter also works as a motivational humorist, and has also held workshops for other comics to learn how to adapt their stand-up acts for a corporate audience. In 2013 she wrote The Message of You (St. Martin’s Press) about motivational speaking as a career.

She has also contributed to National Public Radio’s "All Things Considered" with a radio program that explored how comedy has changed over the years.

Bibliography
 Stand-up Comedy: The Book (1989, Dell)
 The Homo Handbook (1996, Fireside))
 The Comedy Bible (2001, Touchstone)
 The Message of You (2013, St. Martin's Press)

References

External links
 
 

Living people
Writers from Los Angeles
American women in business
American women comedians
Female magicians
Year of birth missing (living people)
Comedians from California
21st-century American women